Christopher Anderson (born 2 October 1990) is an English professional footballer who plays as a midfielder.

Career
Anderson signed a one-year professional contract with Burnley in May 2009, having first joined the club at the age of nine, before being released in May 2011. He signed for Singaporean club Gombak United for the 2012 season, making his professional debut for them in February 2012. Upon his return to England, he started training with North West Counties Football League Premier Division side Colne, going on to sign for the club in December 2013.

References

1990 births
Living people
English footballers
Burnley F.C. players
Gombak United FC players
Colne F.C. players
Association football midfielders
Singapore Premier League players
English expatriate footballers
English expatriate sportspeople in Singapore
Expatriate footballers in Singapore